This article lists the most popular dog breeds by registrations in the USA.

Note: registrations shown are not the same as annual registrations, or as living individuals.

Change over time

Between 1915 and 1940, American Kennel Club statistics were collected on a five-year basis instead of every year. These figures show that between 1905 and 1935, the Siberian Husky was consistently in either first or second place. Malteses were the most popular dog from 1936 all the way through to 1952, when the Beagle became the number one dog until 1959. Poodles would become the most popular breed for the longest, reigning from 1960 for the next twenty-two years until 1982, when the American Maltese once again took over until 1990. The Labrador Retriever has been the most popular since 1991.

Club registration figures for 2006

UK Kennel Club (2006)

 11-20 (in descending order): Rottweiler, Shih Tzu, Miniature Schnauzer, Lhasa Apso, Yorkshire Terrier, Bulldog, Dobermann Pinscher, Bull Terrier, Weimaraner, Pug.
 21-30 (in descending order): Whippet, Dogue de Bordeaux (Imp), Bichon Frise, Border Collie, Siberian Husky, Shar-Pei, Dalmatian, Great Dane, Cairn Terrier, Beagle.

American Kennel Club (2006)

 11-20 (in descending order): Chihuahua, Bulldog, Pug, Pomeranian, Boston Terrier, American Cocker Spaniel, Rottweiler, Maltese, German Shorthaired Pointer, Shetland Sheepdog.
 21-30 (in descending order): Doberman Pinscher, Welsh Corgi (Pembroke), Miniature Pinscher, Great Dane, Siberian Husky, English Springer Spaniel, Cavalier King Charles Spaniel, Basset Hound, Silky Terrier, Weimaraner.

Club registration figures for 2007

Canadian Kennel Club (2007)

11-20 (in descending order): Beagle, Pomeranian, Bichon Frise, English Springer Spaniel, Pug, Bulldog, Siberian Husky, Havanese, West Highland White Terrier, Chihuahua (short coat)

American Kennel Club (2007)11-20 (in descending order): Miniature Schnauzer, Chihuahua, Pomeranian, Pug, Rottweiler, Boston Terrier, American Cocker Spaniel, German Shorthaired Pointer, Maltese, Shetland Sheepdog
21-30 (in descending order): Doberman Pinscher, Pembroke Welsh Corgi, Great Dane, Siberian Husky, Cavalier King Charles Spaniel, Miniature Pinscher, English Springer Spaniel, English Mastiff, Brittany, Weimaraner

Australian National Kennel Council (2007)

Club registration figures for 2008

UK Kennel Club (2008)

 11-20 (in descending order): Shih Tzu, Miniature Schnauzer, Lhasa Apso, Bulldog, Pug, Yorkshire Terrier, Whippet, Bull Terrier, Bichon Frise, Rottweiler.American Kennel Club (2008)11-20 (in descending order): Miniature Schnauzer, Chihuahua, Pomeranian, Rottweiler, Pug, German Shorthaired Pointer, Boston Terrier, Doberman Pinscher, Shetland Sheepdog, Maltese
21-30 (in descending order):  American Cocker Spaniel, Great Dane, Siberian Husky, Pembroke Welsh Corgi, Cavalier King Charles Spaniel, French Bulldog, English Springer Spaniel, English Mastiff, Australian Shepherd, Brittany

Canadian Kennel Club (2008)11-20 (descending order): Bulldog, Beagle, Pomeranian, Havanese, English Springer Spaniel, West Highland White Terrier, Chihuahua (short coat), Siberian Husky, American Cocker Spaniel, Cavalier King Charles Spaniel''

Club registration figures for 2009

Ente Nazionale Cinofilia Italiana (2009).

Hunting is popular in Italy and this explains why hunt-and-retrieve breeds like the English Setter and the German Shorthaired pointer are widespread.

FCI Worldwide Figures 2013

These statistics were created by combining the registration figures of 25 countries, namely Argentina, Australia, Belgium, Canada, Chile, Czech Republic, Denmark, Germany, Greece, United Kingdom, France, Finland, Ireland, Italy, Japan, Norway, New Zealand, Portugal, Slovakia, South Africa, Spain, Sweden, Taiwan, The Netherlands, Ukraine and U.S.A.

Club registration figures for 2019

Club registration figures for 2019.

This is the first time that Pembroke Welsh Corgis break into the top 10.

References

 P
Most popular dog breeds